Taft Mosswood is a census-designated place (CDP) in San Joaquin County, California, United States. The population was 1,530 at the 2010 census, up from 1,388 at the 2000 census. It comprises an unincorporated "island" within the City of Stockton.

Geography
Taft Mosswood is located at  (37.916324, -121.281563).

Demographics

2010
The 2010 United States Census reported that Taft Mosswood had a population of 1,530. The racial makeup of Taft Mosswood was 443 (29.0%) White, 192 (12.5%) African American, 10 (0.7%) Native American, 183 (12.0%) Asian, 1 (0.1%) Pacific Islander, 617 (40.3%) from other races, and 84 (5.5%) from two or more races. Hispanic or Latino of any race were 1,099 persons (71.8%).

The Census reported that 1,517 people (99.2% of the population) lived in households, 13 (0.8%) lived in non-institutionalized group quarters, and 0 (0%) were institutionalized.

There were 364 households, out of which 202 (55.5%) had children under the age of 18 living in them, 174 (47.8%) were opposite-sex married couples living together, 88 (24.2%) had a female householder with no husband present, 44 (12.1%) had a male householder with no wife present.  There were 32 (8.8%) unmarried opposite-sex partnerships, and 5 (1.4%) same-sex married couples or partnerships. 38 households (10.4%) were made up of individuals, and 20 (5.5%) had someone living alone who was 65 years of age or older. The average household size was 4.17.  There were 306 families (84.1% of all households); the average family size was 4.39.

The population was spread out, with 514 people (33.6%) under the age of 18, 198 people (12.9%) aged 18 to 24, 399 people (26.1%) aged 25 to 44, 271 people (17.7%) aged 45 to 64, and 148 people (9.7%) who were 65 years of age or older.  The median age was 27.9 years. For every 100 females, there were 104.3 males.  For every 100 females age 18 and over, there were 104.8 males.

The homeowner vacancy rate was 5.8%; the rental vacancy rate was 12.1%.  854 people (55.8% of the population) lived in owner-occupied housing units and 663 people (43.3%) lived in rental housing units.

2000
As of the census of 2000, there were 1,388 people, 341 households, and 282 families residing in the CDP. The racial makeup of the CDP was 23.70% White, 18.52% African American, 0.86% Native American, 15.56% Asian, 0.79% Pacific Islander, 35.16% from other races, and 5.40% from two or more races. Hispanic or Latino of any race were 58.65% of the population.

There were 341 households, out of which 49.9% had children under the age of 18 living with them, 49.3% were married couples living together, 24.9% had a female householder with no husband present, and 17.3% were non-families. 14.1% of all households were made up of individuals, and 6.7% had someone living alone who was 65 years of age or older.  The average household size was 4.03 and the average family size was 4.37.

In the CDP, the population was spread out, with 37.5% under the age of 18, 12.0% from 18 to 24, 26.2% from 25 to 44, 13.9% from 45 to 64, and 10.4% who were 65 years of age or older.  The median age was 25 years. For every 100 females, there were 98.6 males.  For every 100 females age 18 and over, there were 95.7 males.

The median income for a household in the CDP was $23,365, and the median income for a family was $24,342. Males had a median income of $27,833 versus $18,510 for females. The per capita income for the CDP was $8,382.  About 36.1% of families and 35.2% of the population were below the poverty line, including 35.2% of those under age 18 and 22.2% of those age 65 or over.

References

Census-designated places in San Joaquin County, California
Census-designated places in California